Harry Beswick FRIBA (1856 - 8 July 1929) was County Architect for Chester from 1895 until 1926.

Career
He was born in Chester and educated at King's School, Chester where he was awarded the Duke of Westminster Gold Medal in 1871. He was articled to Thomas Meakin Lockwood of Chester from 1871 and later returned as his Managing Clerk in 1881.

He began independent practice in 1889 and in 1895 he was appointed County Architect to Cheshire County in 1895 and architect to the Cheshire Education Committee from 1904.

In 1905 he was awarded a Fellowship of the Royal Institute of British Architects.

He retired in 1926.

Life
He was born in 1855, the son of William Beswick (1822-1887) and Mary Morley (1825-1915). His father was the schoolmaster at Upton-by-Chester.

On 12 August 1882 he married Edith, daughter of Charles Anderson at Aldford Parish Church. They had the following children:
Agnes Marion Beswick (1884-1977)
Jessie Beswick (b. 1886)
William Beswick (1888-1981) also an architect
Harry Beswick (b. 1890) also an architect
Isabel Marjory Louisa Beswick (1894-1973)

He died on 8 July 1929.

Buildings

National School, Guilden Sutton 1890-91
Oakfield Manor 1892
Church of the Good Shepherd, Charlotte Street, Chester, 1894-95
Westminster Schools, Peploe Street, Hoole (new classrooms) 1894-95
St Martin’s Welsh Church, Chester (new church room) 1895-96
Agricultural School, Salterford Hall, Holmes Chapel 1896
Church School, Mollington 1896-97
Unionist Club, Newgate Street, Chester 1896-97
3 Northgate Street, Chester 1899
21-23 Northgate Street, Chester 1897 (for Charles Brown)
Runcorn Police Station (extension) 1898-99
Sealand Isolation Hospital, Chester 1899
Terrace of 6 houses, 158-168 New Chester Road, Port Sunlight 1899 
Police Court, Liscard, Wallasey 1900
Police Station, Audlem 1901
Plinth for the statue of Queen Victoria, Chester Castle, 1903
Ruskin School, Ruskin Road, Crewe 1909
Macclesfield High School for Girls, 1908-09
St Werburgh Middle School, Love Street, Chester 1909
Teacher Training College, Crewe 1910-11
Police Station, Station Road, Cheadle Hulme 1911
Caretaker’s House, Ruskin Road Schoo, Rook Street 1909
Altrincham County School for Boys 1910
Police Station, Victoria Square, Stockton Heath 1911
Police Station, Telegraph Road, Heswall 1911
Grammar School, Marlborough Road, Bowdon 1911
Lymm Grammar School (additions) 1911-12
Alderley Edge Council School (additions) 1912
Aston Council School, Runcorn 1912
Upton Asylum (new buildings) 1913
Brown and Co, Eastgate Street, Chester (extension) 1914-15
Grammar School, Nantwich 1915-21 (now Malbank School)
County High School for Girls, West Kirby (additions) 1921
Reaseheath School of Agrigulcture, (new buildings) 1924
Altrincham Grammar School for Boys (additions) 1925
Court House and Constabulary, 70-104 Chapel Street, Dukinfield
Altrincham Grammar School for Girls (additions)
Police Station, Green Lane, Wilmslow
Knot Hotel, 51 Whitby Road, Ellesmere Port
Police Station, High Street, Taporley
Police Station and Court, Westminster Road, Ellesmere Port
Police Station and Court, Barnhill Road, Broxton

References

1856 births
1929 deaths
Architects from Cheshire
Fellows of the Royal Institute of British Architects
People educated at The King's School, Chester